The Stampede North American Heavyweight Championship was the major title in the Canadian professional wrestling promotion Stampede Wrestling. From its establishment in 1968 until 1972, it was Stampede's secondary singles championship, becoming the top title in 1972 after the previous top championship, the Calgary version of the NWA Canadian Heavyweight Championship (Calgary version), was abandoned.

Title history

See also
Stampede Wrestling

References

External links
Wrestling-Titles.com

Heavyweight wrestling championships
North American professional wrestling championships
North American Heavyweight